In algebraic geometry, the Reiss relation, introduced by ,  is a condition on the second-order elements of the points of a plane algebraic curve meeting a given line.

Statement

If C is a complex plane curve given by the zeros of a polynomial f(x,y) of two variables, and L is a line meeting C transversely and not meeting C at infinity, then

where the sum is over the points of intersection of C and L, and fx, fxy and so on stand for partial derivatives of f  .
This can also be written as

where κ is the curvature of the curve C and θ is the angle its tangent line makes with L, and the sum is again over the points of intersection of C and L .

References

Akivis, M. A.; Goldberg, V. V.: Projective differential geometry of submanifolds. North-Holland Mathematical Library, 49. North-Holland Publishing Co., Amsterdam, 1993 (chapter 8).

Theorems in algebraic geometry
Algebraic curves